Tim Lawson may refer to:

Tim Lawson (writer) (born 1961), American writer and musician
T. Allen Lawson (born 1963), American painter
Timothy Lawson (born 1943), British Olympic hockey player